Seward Clough "Sew" Leeka (September 15, 1907 – October 11, 1985) was an American professional basketball player. He played for the Akron Firestone Non-Skids in the National Basketball League for nine games during the 1937–38 season and averaged 2.4 points per game. He later served in World War II and coached high school football in Freeport, Texas.

References

1907 births
1985 deaths
Akron Firestone Non-Skids players
Amateur Athletic Union men's basketball players
American men's basketball players
United States Navy personnel of World War II
Basketball players from Missouri
Guards (basketball)
High school football coaches in Texas
Iowa Hawkeyes men's basketball players
People from Independence, Missouri